The Western Sudan pony (also known as the Darfur pony, Gharkawi, and Kordofani) is a breed of pony that is found in southern Darfur and southwestern Kordofan in Sudan. 

It is usually light bay, chestnut or grey with white markings.

References

Horse breeds
Animal breeds originating in Sudan